One True Vine is the ninth solo studio album by Mavis Staples. It was released in June 2013 by ANTI- Records. It is her 13th studio album, and the second on which she collaborated with record producer and Wilco frontman Jeff Tweedy. Tweedy also played most of the instruments on the album, with the exception of the drums, which were played by his son, Spencer Tweedy. The album was recorded at the Wilco Loft in Chicago, and while working on it, Staples commuted back and forth between the Loft (on Chicago's North Side) and her home on Chicago's South Side. One True Vine debuted at #67 on the Billboard 200 chart dated for July 13, 2013, marking the highest peaking entry for Staples on the chart so far.

Track list

Personnel
Mavis Staples - lead vocals
Jeff Tweedy - guitars; bass; horn arrangements on tracks 4 and 6; background vocals on track 3; percussion on tracks 8 and 9; Wurlitzer electric piano and piano on track 4; OP1 synthesizer on track 5; marxophone, Mellotron and organ on track 6; slide guitar on track 7
Spencer Tweedy - drums on tracks 2-10; percussion on tracks 2, 5, 7, 8 and 9
Mark Greenberg - Wurlitzer electric piano on track 1
Scott Ligon - piano on track 10
Rick Holmstrom - electric guitar on track 7
Paul Von Mertens - clarinet on tracks 4 and 6; baritone saxophone and horn arrangements on track 6
Andrew Baker - bass trumpet on tracks 4 and 6; euphonium on track 6
Donny Gerrard - background vocals on tracks 1-9; percussion on tracks 4 and 8
Kelly Hogan - background vocals on tracks 1-9
Tiffany "Makeda" Francisco - background vocals on tracks 1-9
Liam Cunningham - background vocals on track 8

Charts

References

External links
One True Vine by Mavis Staples at iTunes.com

Mavis Staples albums
2013 albums
Anti- (record label) albums
Albums produced by Jeff Tweedy